Joe Augustine (born December 17, 1955) is an American former professional ice hockey defenceman. He is currently the head coach of the ACHA Division 1 Rhode Island Rams. Augustine was selected by the Atlanta Flames in the 11th round (181st overall) of the 1975 NHL Amateur Draft, and was also drafted by the Cleveland Crusaders in the 6th round (78th overall) of the 1975 WHA Amateur Draft.

Playing career
Augustine attended Boston College where he played NCAA Division I hockey with the Boston College Eagles of the ECAC Hockey conference, but left after his junior year to play professionally.

Coaching career
Following his playing career, Augustine spent three seasons as a high school coach, and then two seasons as an assistant coach with Brown University, before joining Rhode Island as their head coach in 1989. In 2013, Augustine recorded his 500th career win with the Rams, the second highest of all time for a University of Rhode Island coach in a single sport. Augustine was named ACHA Coach of the Year in both 2005 and 2006.Augustine won the 700th game of his coaching career on March 3, 2023 as the Rhode Island Rams defeated Drexel University 4-3 in a come from behind victory in the quarterfinals of the Eastern States Collegiate Hockey League quarterfinals.

References

External links

1955 births
American men's ice hockey defensemen
Atlanta Flames draft picks
Birmingham South Stars players
Boston College Eagles men's ice hockey players
Cleveland Crusaders draft picks
Ice hockey people from Chicago
Living people
Muskegon Mohawks players
New Haven Nighthawks players
Richmond Rifles players
Springfield Indians players
Tulsa Oilers (1964–1984) players
Wichita Wind players